The Scout and Guide movement in Papua New Guinea is served by
 Girl Guides Association of Papua New Guinea, member of the World Association of Girl Guides and Girl Scouts
 The Scout Association of Papua New Guinea, member of the World Organization of the Scout Movement

See also